Paninternational was a West German leisure airline headquartered in Munich with bases at Munich-Riem Airport and Düsseldorf Airport.

History

The airline was founded by Munich-based tour operator Paneuropa in 1968 and started operations in 1970. After commencing leisure operations within Europe using their new BAC 1-11-500s, Paninternational rapidly acquired two Boeing 707-120 pre-owned by American Airlines to expand into long-haul flights. 

It ceased operations already in 1971 in the aftermath of the accident of Paninternational Flight 112, which gained large media attention and negative publicity.

Fleet
Paninternational operated the following aircraft:

 2 Boeing 707-120
 4 BAC 1-11-500 (one lost while operating as Paninternational Flight 112.

Accidents and incidents
Paninternational suffered one major accident during its existence, which ultimately led to its shutdown:

 A BAC 1-11-500 was lost on 6 September 1971 in the accident of Paninternational Flight 112 when it crash-landed on a highway shortly after takeoff from Hamburg Airport on its way to Málaga. Twenty-two passengers and crew were killed in the incident, caused by an unintentional filling of the aircraft's engine water injection system with jet fuel which led to a failure of both engines.

References

External links

 
Defunct airlines of Germany
Airlines established in 1968
Airlines disestablished in 1971
1968 establishments in West Germany
1971 disestablishments in West Germany